The Wanamaker Triplane or Curtiss Model T, retroactively renamed Curtiss Model 3 was a large experimental four-engined triplane patrol flying boat of World War I. It was the first four-engined aircraft built in the United States. Only a single example (No.3073) was completed. At the time, the Triplane was the largest seaplane in the world.

Design and development 

In 1915, the American businessman Rodman Wanamaker who, prior to the outbreak of the First World War commissioned the Curtiss Aeroplane and Motor Company to build a large flying boat, America to win the £10,000 prize put forward by the British newspaper Daily Mail for the first aircraft to cross the Atlantic, commissioned Curtiss to build a new, even larger flying boat for transatlantic flight that became known as the Wanamaker Triplane, or Curtiss Model T, (retroactively re-designated Model 3 when Curtiss changed its designation system).

Early press reports showed a large triplane, 68 ft (17.9 metres) and with equal-span six-bay wings of 133 foot (40.5 metre) span. The aircraft, to be capable of carrying heavy armament, was estimated to have an all-up weight of 21,450 pounds (9,750 kilogrammes) and was to be powered by six 140 hp 104 kW) engines driving three propellers, two of which were to be of tractor configuration and the third a pusher.

The British Royal Naval Air Service (RNAS) placed an order for 20 Triplanes.
The first one was completed at the Curtiss factory, Buffalo, New York in July 1916.
This was the first four-engined aircraft to be built in the United States and one of the largest aircraft in the world.

The finished Model T differed from the aircraft discussed in the press in various points. Size and weight were similar, with the upper wing having a span of 134 feet, but the other wings had different spans.
It was planned to be powered by four tractor 250 hp (187 kW) Curtiss V-4 engines installed individually on the middle wing, which was unusual for the time.
The crew of two pilots and a flight engineer were provided with an enclosed cabin, similar to the Curtiss Model H.
To reduce the forces a pilot would need to use on the controls, small windmills could be connected to the aileron cables by electrically operated clutches to act as a form of power assisted controls.

As the planned Curtiss V-4 engines were not available when the prototype was completed, it was decided not to fly the aircraft in the United States, but to take it to England by ship. where it was reassembled at the naval air station Felixstowe.
Initially it was fitted with four 240 hp (180 kW) Renault engines, but these were soon exchanged for four 250 hp Rolls-Royce Eagles.

As the aircraft was damaged beyond repair on the maiden flight it was considered unsuccessful, and the order for the remaining nineteen cancelled.
The Wanamaker Triplane did however, provide the inspiration for John Porte of the Seaplane Experimental Station to build a massive five-engined flying boat of similar layout, the Felixstowe Fury.

Operators 

 Royal Naval Air Service
RNAS Felixstowe

Specifications (Renault engines)

See also

References

Notes

Bibliography

 "A Fighting Flying Boat". Flight, 13 January 1916, pp. 43–44.
 Bowers, Peter M. Curtiss Aircraft 1907–1947. London:Putnam, 1979. .
 Bruce, J.M. "Historic Military Aircraft No. 11 Part 3:The Felixstowe Flying Boats". Flight, 23 December 1955, pp. 929–932.
 Thetford, Owen. British Naval Aircraft since 1912. London:Putnam, Fourth edition, 1978. .

Flying boats
Wanamaker Triplane
1910s United States patrol aircraft
Triplanes
Four-engined tractor aircraft
Aircraft first flown in 1916
Four-engined piston aircraft